Kabwe is the capital of the Zambian Central Province and the Kabwe District, with a population estimated at 202,914 at the 2010 census. Named Broken Hill until 1966, it was founded when lead and zinc deposits were discovered in 1902. Kabwe also has a claim to being the birthplace of Zambian politics as it was an important political centre during the colonial period.

Kabwe is an important transportation, farming and university centre. Kabwe is becoming a major agricultural hub for the country is the headquarters for Zambia Railways and prison services. Additionally the mining industry has been important to the economic development of the region. However, because of the exceptional contamination of the city with lead and other toxins, and the effects of these on local children's health, a March 2022 report by the UN Special Rapporteur on Human Rights and the Environment identified the town as a sacrifice zone for industry.

History

Headquarters of Zambia Railways 

The first railway in the country, operated by Rhodesian Railways when the territory was administered as North-Western Rhodesia and North-Eastern Rhodesia, reached the Broken Hill mine as early as 1906, and the town became the northern base for the railway, which was the second biggest employer after the mining industry. A locomotive maintenance facility was constructed there. In 1909 the railway reached Ndola in what was to become the Copperbelt.

The railway workers' unions played a large role in the politics of the country. In racially segregated colonial times before Africans had the vote, the town was the seat of Roy Welensky, leader of the powerful Rhodesia Railway Workers Union (RRWU), who became prime minister of the ill-fated Federation of Rhodesia and Nyasaland, which was opposed by the Northern Rhodesia Railway trade union (the black Africans' union) led by Dixon Konkola and also based in Kabwe.
 
Today, the town is the headquarters of Zambia Railways but employment levels on the railway have been heavily cut.

Independence protest 
Reflecting Kabwe's central location and railway union base, it was chosen as the site for a rally held on October 26, 1958, at Mulungushi Rock north of the city by the Kaunda-Kapwepwe breakaway group from the Zambian African National Congress.  Later, they founded the political party UNIP which led the successful independence movement and continued to hold conferences at Mulungushi Rock, which became known as the 'birthplace of independence' in Zambia.

Districts

Makululu 
A large informal settlement on the outskirts of the city, Makululu is an important district in the town. The settlement is on the edge of the Lukanga Swamp, and is thus vulnerable to flooding. Similarly, the water is highly contaminated from both poor sanitation and the broader industrial pollution from the mine.

Environmental issues

Mine pollution 
A study by the Blacksmith Institute found Kabwe to be one of the ten most polluted places in the world due mostly to heavy metal (mostly zinc and lead) tailings making their way into the local water supply. A 2014 report indicates that children's blood lead levels continue to be elevated even though mining has stopped. A 2020 study, found high levels of lead and cadmium in blood levels. A March 2022 report by the UN Special Rapporteur on Human Rights and the Environment identified the town as a sacrifice zone for industry.

Other studies, have found high potential for copper, cobalt and other non-lead materials in leachate from the mine.

A class action lawsuit was launched against Anglo American plc, alleging that it ignored the required safety standards despite knowing about the harms caused. Anglo-American was the majority owner of the mine from 1925 until its 1974 nationalization by the Zambian government. A certification hearing was held at the High Court of South Africa's Johannesburg branch in February 2023.

Transportation 
As well as being on the main Zambia Railways line, it lies on the Great North Road.

On February 7, 2013, a bus collided with two cars near Kabwe, killing 53 people. It was one of the worst road accidents in Zambian history.

Industries and agriculture 
Historically the economy of Kabwe has been dominated by the mine. Other industries include pharmaceuticals, milling and cotton ginning, and Kabwe's first Drinking Water Plant (Aquador Purifed Water) and leather tanning.

To the east of the city are the hydro-electric power stations of the Mulungushi Dam, Mita Hills Dam and Lunsemfwa Falls, built to power the mine and town.

Commercial farming areas surround the city about 10 km from the centre, and the road and rail links provide ready access to the markets of the Copperbelt and Lusaka.

Mine 
The name Kabwe or Kabwe-Ka Mukuba means 'ore' or 'smelting' but the European/Australian prospectors named it Broken Hill after a similar mine in Broken Hill, New South Wales, Australia. The mine was the largest in the country for around thirty years until it was overtaken in the early 1930s by larger copper mining complexes on the Copperbelt.  Apart from lead and zinc it also produced silver, manganese and heavy metals such as cadmium, vanadium, and titanium in smaller quantities.

In 1921 a human fossil, a skull, dubbed Kabwe 1, also "Broken Hill Man" or "Rhodesian Man" (classified as Homo rhodesiensis or Homo heidelbergensis) was found in the mine.

Anglo American plc became the majority owner of the mine in 1925, until the mine was nationalized in 1974 by the Zambian government, who closed it in 1994.

The mine, which occupies a 2.5 km2 site 1 km south-west of the town centre, is closed but metals are still extracted from old tailings.

Closure of the mine led to economic decline for Kabwe. It has a number of manufacturing industries including the Zambia-China Mulungushi textiles plant established with Chinese investment in the 1980s, but after suffering large losses this plant closed (temporarily according to management) at the beginning of 2007.

Climate

Institutions and attractions 
 Mulungushi Rock of Authority, north of the city
 Mulungushi University
 Kabwe Warriors football club, one of the top three teams in the country
 Zambia National Service Training School
 Chindwin Barracks and Kohima Barracks (Zambian Defence Force)
 Mulungushi Boat Club, Mulungushi Dam
 Kwame Nkrumah University, a public institution of higher education
 Paglory University
 Ellensmere High School

Notable people 
 Wilbur Smith, novelist
 Michael Norgrove, boxer
 Tutwa Ngulube, politician

References

External links

http://www.daily-mail.co.zm/the-rebirth-of-kabwe-town/
http://www.bmrplc.com/kabwe_mine.php
https://www.investincentralzambia.com/wordpress/kabwe-district-profile/
https://www.mindat.org/loc-4341.htm
https://www.zambia-info.org/country/town/1316/kabwe

 
Populated places in Central Province, Zambia
Provincial capitals in Zambia
Mining communities in Africa
Mining in Zambia
1902 establishments in the British Empire